Noel Michael Kearney (born 7 October 1942) is an English former footballer who played in the Football League as a winger for Colchester United.

Career

Born in Ipswich, Kearney began his career with hometown club Ipswich Town, signing in October 1960. He spent four years with the club, making
50 youth appearances and 44 reserve appearances. He scored 79 goals at youth level and scored seven times in the reserve team, but failed to break into the first-team at the club.

He signed for Colchester United in September 1964 on trial from Ipswich at the age of 21, and went on to make his Football League debut on 12 September during a 3–0 defeat to Brentford at Layer Road. Kearney made three appearances for the U's, featuring for the final time on 5 October 1964 in another home defeat, on this occasion 1–0 to Grimsby Town.

After leaving Colchester, Kearney signed to Chelmsford City before retiring from the game. He became a builder following the end of his footballing career.

References

1942 births
Living people
Sportspeople from Ipswich
English footballers
Association football wingers
Ipswich Town F.C. players
Colchester United F.C. players
Chelmsford City F.C. players
English Football League players